The Statuette of Neferefre was found in several fragments by Czechoslovakian excavations in 1984–85 in the remains of the pyramid temple of the king at Abusir. It was once about 34 cm high.  The statuette is now on display in the Egyptian Museum of Cairo (JE 98171). Due to the good preservation of the face and the well preserved colours it is one of the most famous examples of Egyptian royal sculpture dating to the Old Kingdom.

Details 
The statue is made of pink limestone and was found in several fragments but the remains are not complete. It shows the king sitting on a throne. The latter is mostly missing. The king wears a short wig. At his forehead there is now a hole for holding an Uraeus, that is lost today. The hair is painted black, above the lips is painted a black mustache. The nose is partly broken. The king had a ceremonial beard that is lost today. On his neck is sitting a falcon spreading its wings over the back of the king's head. In both crawls it is holding a Shen ring. The king is shown bare-chested. In his right hand he is holding a mace. The left arm is mostly missing. The lower part of the body is mostly missing too. The well carved knees are preserved showing that he was wearing a shendit kilt. There is a fragment from the base with the remains of the right foot. On the base is carved the short inscription: the king of Upper and Lower Egypt, Neferefre, for eternity. There is finally a fragment from the back of the throne and one other, undecorated fragment of the base.

Discovery 
The fragments were found at three places within the pyramid temple of Neferefre. Four of them were found in columned hall in the south west part of the temple. Three further fragments come from a long storage room, just south of this hall, two other fragments from a small room east of the hall.

Bibliography 
Miroslav Verner: Abusir XXVIII, The Statues of Raneferef and the Royal Sculpture of the Fifth Dynasty, Charles University, Prague 2017,

References 

Sculptures of ancient Egypt
Fifth Dynasty of Egypt
Egyptian Museum